Nico Kurz (born 31 January 1997) is a German darts player currently playing in Professional Darts Corporation events.

In 2018, he qualified as a German Superleague qualifier for the 2018 German Darts Masters in the 2018 World Series of Darts, but lost 6–5 against Jamie Lewis. He made his European Tour debut by qualifying for the 2019 European Darts Open but lost 6–5 against Kim Huybrechts after missing seven match darts.

At the 2019 German Darts Masters Kurz caused a huge upset by beating world number three Gary Anderson 6–4 in the first round and hitting a maximum 170 finish in the match, but lost 6–8 to Peter Wright in the Quarter-finals.

World Championship results

PDC

 2020: Third round (lost to Luke Humphries 2–4)
 2021: Second round (lost to Gabriel Clemens 1–3)

Performance timeline
PDC

References

External links

Living people
German darts players
Professional Darts Corporation associate players
1997 births
Sportspeople from Hanau